Reims  or Rheims is a city of the Champagne-Ardenne région of northern France.

Reims may refer to:

 12280 Reims, a main-belt asteroid
 Reims Aviation, a French aircraft manufacturer
 Stade Reims, a French football team
 REIMS, Rapid evaporative ionization mass spectrometry, an ionization technique in mass spectrometry
 REIMS, Remuneration of International Mails, an international postal charging system
 Reims-Gueux, a motor racing road course near the city.

See also

 Battle of Reims (disambiguation)